The Reichsbund der Deutschen Beamten (RDB), meaning "Reich Federation of German Civil Servants", also known as NS-Beamtenbund (National Socialist Civil Servants Federation), was the trade union for German State Officials during the Third Reich. The RDB was established as an organization affiliated to the Nazi party in October 1933. Its leader was Herman Neef. Neef had been previously leading the RDB's predecessor organisation, Deutscher Beamtenbund German Civil Service Federation, which had been founded in December 1918.

Although it was not compulsory for RDB members to be Nazi party members, most of them chose to be. In addition to the training and development of its members, the RDB ensured that German Civil Servants toed the line of the Nazi Party.

Following Nazi Germany's defeat in World War II, the American Military Government issued a special law outlawing the Nazi party and all of its branches. Known as "Law number five", this denazification decree disbanded the National Socialist Civil Servants Federation, like all other organizations linked to the Nazi Party. In the postwar years, it was reestablished as the German Civil Service Federation in the Federal Republic of Germany.

See also
German Civil Service Federation

Notes and references

Trade unions established in 1933
1933 establishments in Germany
Organizations disestablished in 1945
Nazi Party organizations
Defunct trade unions of Germany
Fascist trade unions